Eia or EIA may refer to:

Medicine
 Enzyme immunoassay
 Equine infectious anemia
 Exercise-induced anaphylaxis
 Exercise-induced asthma
 External iliac artery

Transport
 Edmonton International Airport, in Alberta, Canada
 Erbil International Airport, in Kurdistan Region, Iraq
 Evergreen International Airlines, an American airline

Other uses
 Eia, a former Medieval manor that is now part of Central London
 Electronic Industries Alliance, formerly Electronic Industries Association, an American trade organization
 EIA standards
 Emerging issues analysis
 Emirates Investment Authority
 Energy Information Administration of the United States Department of Energy
 Environmental impact assessment
 Environmental Investigation Agency, a British environmental organisation
 Equity-indexed annuity
 European Inventor Award, awarded annually by the European Patent Office
 International Anticommunist Entente

People with the surname 
 Harald Eia (born 1966), Norwegian comedian
 Magnhild Eia (born 1960), Norwegian politician